The Overexposed Tour was the eighth concert tour by the American pop rock band Maroon 5, in support of their fourth studio album, Overexposed (2012). The tour consisted of shows in Americas, Asia, Europe and Oceania and included the band's first concerts in several countries.

Setlist
 "Payphone"
 "Never Gonna Leave This Bed"
 "Makes Me Wonder"
 "Lucky Strike"
 "Sunday Morning"
 "If I Never See Your Face Again"
 "Wipe Your Eyes" 
 "Won't Go Home Without You"
 "Love Somebody"
 "Harder to Breathe"  
 "Wake Up Call"
 "The Bed's Too Big Without You" 
 "One More Night"
 "Hands All Over" 
 "Misery"
 "This Love" / "Don't Forget Me" 

Encore

Opening acts
 Keane (Brazil)
 Javier Colon (Argentina, Peru, Paraguay)
 The Cab (Asia, Australia)
 Rozzi Crane (North America)
 Neon Trees (North America)
 A Great Big World (North America)
 Owl City (North America)
 The Black Keys (North America)
 Evermore (Australia)
 PJ Morton (Europe)
 Robin Thicke (Europe)

Shows

Box office score data

Notes

References

2012 concert tours
2013 concert tours
2014 concert tours
Maroon 5 concert tours
Concert tours of North America
Concert tours of South America
Concert tours of the United States
Concert tours of Asia
Concert tours of Canada
Concert tours of Europe